Debug is a 2014 Canadian science fiction horror film written and directed by David Hewlett.  It stars Jeananne Goossen, Adrian Holmes, Adam Butcher, Kjartan Hewitt, Sidney Leeder, and Jadyn Wong as computer programmers who must deal with a hostile artificial intelligence on an interstellar spaceship.  It was released on 3 November 2014 in the UK.

Plot 

Six programmers incarcerated for hacking are out on work release, lead by the corrections officer Capra. Their mission is to reboot and restore the abandoned spacecraft found floating aimlessly through space.

Once on the spacecraft each hacker is assigned a task to reboot the system. Before assignment begins Mel argues that he should be in charge of the task because Kaida had a fellow prisoner killed on last work release (unknown if intentional or accidental). Capra, the corrections Officer, puts Mel in charge and the mission begins. Capra restores power to the spacecraft so the hackers can get to work, each working on different computer terminals in separate levels of the ship, communicating through virtual headsets.

The system goes into lockdown, trapping the entire crew on the vessel. With Capra locked in with the rest of the hackers and nowhere to go, he decides to take a look around. Finding a medical bay, Capra straps himself to an arm receptacle to test his blood pressure. His arm gets trapped and a needle appears, with the AI system taking form in front of him. Capra is then injected with nanotech that turns him into a killing machine acting for the AI.

Kaida and James start to experience the illusions of the AI system. Meanwhile Mel and Lara, who are secret lovers, get tricked by the AI system and lured into trouble. Samson, who is scared of rats, sets a trap for a rat, which leads to the AI system trapping him, when suddenly Capra appears. Diondra links into the AI system to reboot it when the AI programs tempts her with a cube full of bank accounts from the former crew aboard the spacecraft that all went missing. Diondra is lead into a sewage pipe, where a decayed dead body appears; she kicks it down the pipe and learns the dead body had the cube on it. Diondra follows after the body to find the cube, the AI system locks the door behind her, and floods the pipe with sewage.

Mel, James, and Kaida meet up after experiencing all the strange things the AI system is doing. Mel argues with Kaida and James defends her, then Capra appears and attacks the hackers. Kaida manages to kill Capra by shutting the airlock on him.

James is wounded and unconscious, and Kaida is brought into the AI system simulation. Here she faces the AI lead system and proceeds to fight. Eventually Kaida destroys the AI but has no way of getting out. James is then seen waking up, and James and Kaida are now the only survivors.

The final scene shows James no longer a prisoner but instead an Admiral of the same spacecraft with Kaida who is now in the virtual world as the AI operating system. They are leading a new expedition with a new crew.

Cast

Production 
Writer-director Hewlett was inspired by Stanley Kubrick's 2001: A Space Odyssey, which he saw as a child.  Hewlett said that he wanted to make a film from the point of view of HAL 9000, the antagonist of that story.  This idea was eventually rejected as too artistic, and the plot was retooled to be more similar to Final Destination.  Hewlett said that he did not see HAL 9000 as evil, and he designed Iam to be defending his right to exist.  Hewlett intentionally cast Momoa as the ship's AI against type.  Momoa wanted to do a project different than his traditional roles, and Hewlett was impressed with Momoa's creativity and range; the two men had previously worked together on the sci-fi series Stargate Atlantis.  Although there were concerns about the AI's name, Iam, Hewlett settled the disputes by stating that names are inherently subjective.

Production took place at Pinewood Toronto Studios, and was scheduled to run from 14 February to 8 March.  Producer Steve Hoban, who previously collaborated with Hewlett on Vincenzo Natali's films, described it as "Final Destination meets Cube".  In September 2014, Shock Till You Drop reported that it had completed production and was awaiting distribution.

Release 
Signature Entertainment released Debug in the UK on 3 November 2014.  Entertainment One distributed the film in Canada.  Ketchup released it on DVD in the US on June 9, 2015.

Reception 
Charles Packer of Sci Fi Online rated it 7/10 stars and wrote that the film is unoriginal but worth a watch.  Joel Harley of HorrorTalk rated it 2/5 stars and described it as "essentially a low-budget 2001: A Space Odyssey for people who want none of the art, story or believable special effects (or three hour runtime) that go hand-in-hand with Kubrick's classic."  Brad Wheeler of The Globe and Mail rated it 0/5 stars and said it "falls short of even its modest budget".  Calum Marsh of the National Post rated it 1.5/4 stars and wrote it lacks Cubes wit.  Bruce DeMara of The Toronto Star rated it 2.5/4 stars and wrote, "Writer/director David Hewlett's feature film debut, Debug, has some dazzling ideas and visuals but falters in the end."  Jim Slotek of The Toronto Sun praised the film's production values but said the execution and story were "machinelike".  Randall King of the Winnipeg Free Press wrote that the film's plot might have worked 20 years ago, but the film only serves to devalue Canadian exploitation films now.

References

External links 
 
 

2014 films
2014 horror films
2010s science fiction horror films
Canadian independent films
English-language Canadian films
Films about artificial intelligence
Films shot in Toronto
Films set on spacecraft
Canadian science fiction horror films
2010s English-language films
2010s Canadian films
Copperheart Entertainment films